Dowlatabad (also Romanized as Dowlatābād; also known as Daulatābād) is a village in Sarvestan Rural District, in the Central District of Sarvestan County, Fars Province, Iran. At the 2006 census, its population was 530, in 107 families.

References 

Populated places in Sarvestan County